Pichu Pichu or Picchu Picchu is an inactive eroded volcano in the Andes of Peru. It is located in the Arequipa Region, Arequipa Province, on the border of Pocsi and Tarucani districts.

Name
The name possibly stems from Quechua pikchu pyramid; mountain or prominence with a broad base which ends in sharp peaks. The duplication is probably meant to imply that the mountain has multiple peaks.

Location
Pichu Pichu, together with Nevado Chachani and El Misti, border the city of Arequipa towards the northeast. These volcanoes are found southwest of the principal Cordillera Occidental in the region.

Geography and geology
Pichu Pichu is an extinct volcano with the form of a  ridge which drops off steeply on its western side. The volcano features four different heavily eroded craters. It was active 6.7 million years ago, given the results of potassium-argon dating. Its arcuate shape is the result of a large sector collapse one million years ago, which formed the "Arequipa volcanic landslide". The landslide was violent enough to melt the rocks in the slide, forming pseudotachylite which has been dated to have formed 2.42 million years ago.

Pichu Pichu was glaciated in the past, and this glaciation has left recognizable traces on the mountains including cirques, glacial troughs, hanging valleys and moraines. The removal of the western flank of the volcano was also originally considered to be the result of glacial erosion. A series of hills at the base of Pichu Pichu may be erosion products of moraines or moraines proper associated with the volcano.A fault runs between Pichu Pichu and Coropuna volcano and was active during the last 43,000 years.

Climate and vegetation 
The climate of the region is relatively dry, with most precipitation falling during the summer months when the mountain commonly develops a snow cover. The Poroto and Polobaya rivers originate at the foot of Pichu Pichu and are tributaries of the Rio Chili. The proposed Yanaorco–Paltaorco reservoir would also draw water from the mountain. The Laguna Salinas closed basin northeast of the volcano also receives runoff from Pichu Pichu. Between  elevation, shrub vegetation occurs on Pichu Pichu and the neighbouring volcanoes, whereas above the grassline a Nototriches species is found. Forests of Polylepis rugulosa grow on the mountain.

Archeology 
The mountain was considered to be sacred by the ancient inhabitants of the region. Pichu Pichu is visible from the Wari site at Cerro Baúl and some buildings at that site are constructed in such a way as to point to Pichu Pichu. Processions along the hillside staircase of Cerro Baúl would have the mountain in view. Stone structures are also found on Pichu Pichu itself, including a high altitude staircase that overcomes a steep pitch and a tambo (waystation). Human sacrifices, so-called capacochas, were performed on Pichu Pichu. Mummies were found on the mountain in 1964 along with various archeological findings, but the findings were not published out of fear to avoid attracting graverobbers. An additional body was found in 1996. Overall, three mummies were found on Pichu Pichu. They were probably two females and one male, all 15 years old but one child was about 3.5 years old; probably the youngest human sacrifice known. Anthropomorphic and animal-like statues were recovered from Pichu Pichu.

References

External links
 "Nevado Pichu Pichu" on Summitpost
 "Pichu Pichu, Peru" on Peakbagger

Volcanoes of Peru
Mountains of Arequipa Region
Mountains of Peru
Landforms of Arequipa Region
Five-thousanders of the Andes